Morven is a small village about 7 kilometres east of Culcairn in the eastern Riverina district of New South Wales, Australia. At the 2006 census, Morven has a population of 464 people.

History
Morven commenced its existence as a Cobb and Co Staging Post. Morven Post Office opened on 1 September 1880.

The Round Hill Hotel is somewhat misnamed, because the actual location of the Round Hill property is some kilometres away on the road from Holbrook to Culcairn. The hotel's name was changed from the Bridge Hotel to its current name when the owner of the hotel also became a part owner of the Round Hill property.

The town was serviced by the Holbrook branch railway line until the line was closed over 20 years ago.

Dan "Mad Dog" Morgan

The bushranger Dan "Mad Dog" Morgan roamed the area in the mid-19th century and held up the Round Hill Station property situated along the road to Culcairn. During the hold-up he fatally wounded John McLean, an employee of the station, and a grave and memorial stands at the site to commemorate the event.

Today
In recent years Morven has continued to remain viable with a number of new houses being built and residents moving in. The site of the village still boasts the old church, a set of tennis courts and the Round Hill Hotel.

Notes and references

External links

 Morven Railway Siding

Towns in the Riverina
Towns in New South Wales